is a Japanese international rugby union player who plays as an outside back.

Club career

Matsuda is currently a student at Teikyo University in Tokyo and has appeared for them in both the All-Japan University Rugby Championship and the All-Japan Rugby Football Championship.   After graduating from university he will join up with the Panasonic Wild Knights in 2017.

International

Matsuda represented Japan at Under-20 level from 2012 through to 2014, making 7 appearances in total at the World Rugby Under 20 Championships.   He made his senior international debut as a replacement in a match against  in Vancouver on 11 June 2016.      He went on to make 2 more appearances in the home tests against  during the 2016 mid-year rugby union internationals series, coming on as a substitute in the first test in Toyota and then starting in the second in Tokyo.

References

1994 births
Living people
Japanese rugby union players
Japan international rugby union players
Rugby union fullbacks
Rugby union wings
Sportspeople from Kyoto Prefecture
Sunwolves players
Rugby union fly-halves
Saitama Wild Knights players